Cristofori is an Italian surname. Notable people with the surname include:

Bartolomeo Cristofori (1655–1731), Italian musical instrument maker and inventor
Carlo Cristofori (1813–1891), Italian cardinal
Guido Cristofori (1880-?), an Italian gymnast
Nino Cristofori (1930–2015), Italian politician
Pierpaolo Cristofori (born 1956), Italian modern pentathlete

Italian-language surnames
Patronymic surnames
Surnames from given names